Cardiodactylus is an Asian genus of crickets in the family Gryllidae, subfamily Eneopterinae and tribe Lebinthini.

Species
Species have been recorded from: Japan, South-East Asia, Sri Lanka, Australia and western Pacific islands.  The Orthoptera Species File lists:
 Cardiodactylus minuta Bhowmik, 1981
 Cardiodactylus nigris Bhowmik, 1981
species group Cardiodactylus (efordi) Otte, 2007

New Guinea region only
 Cardiodactylus busu Otte, 2007
 Cardiodactylus canotus Saussure, 1878
 Cardiodactylus efordi Otte, 2007
 Cardiodactylus enkraussi Otte, 2007
 Cardiodactylus javarere Otte, 2007
 Cardiodactylus kokure Otte, 2007
 Cardiodactylus kolombangara Otte, 2007
 Cardiodactylus kukugai Otte, 2007
 Cardiodactylus kuschei Otte, 2007
 Cardiodactylus lavella Otte, 2007
 Cardiodactylus mumurai Otte, 2007
 Cardiodactylus niugini Dong & Robillard, 2016
 Cardiodactylus nobilis Dong & Robillard, 2016
 Cardiodactylus pentecotensis Robillard, 2009
 Cardiodactylus pictus Saussure, 1878
 Cardiodactylus rufidulus Saussure, 1878
 Cardiodactylus shanahani Otte, 2007
 Cardiodactylus singuawa Otte, 2007
 Cardiodactylus tangtalau Otte, 2007
 Cardiodactylus togerao Otte, 2007
 Cardiodactylus wairahu Otte, 2007
 nomen nudum Cardiodactylus malangona Otte, 2007

species group Cardiodactylus (novaeguineae) (Haan, 1844)

 Cardiodactylus admirabilis Tan & Robillard, 2014
 Cardiodactylus aobaensis Robillard, 2009
 Cardiodactylus baitabensis Dong & Robillard, 2016
 Cardiodactylus borneoe Robillard & Gorochov, 2014
 Cardiodactylus brandti Otte, 2007
 Cardiodactylus bulolo Otte, 2007
 Cardiodactylus celebae Robillard, 2014
 Cardiodactylus cheesmani Otte, 2007
 Cardiodactylus contrarius Gorochov, 2014
 Cardiodactylus doloduo Gorochov, 2014
 Cardiodactylus empagatao Otte, 2007
 Cardiodactylus epiensis Robillard, 2009
 Cardiodactylus erniae Robillard & Gorochov, 2014
 Cardiodactylus esakii Otte, 2007
 Cardiodactylus floresiensis Robillard, 2014
 Cardiodactylus fruhstorferi Gorochov & Robillard, 2014
 Cardiodactylus gagnei Otte, 2007
 Cardiodactylus gaimardi (Serville, 1838)
 Cardiodactylus gressitti Otte, 2007
 Cardiodactylus guttulus (Matsumura, 1913)
 Cardiodactylus haanii Saussure, 1878
 Cardiodactylus haddocki Dong & Robillard, 2016
 Cardiodactylus halmahera Gorochov & Robillard, 2014
 Cardiodactylus hentownesi Otte, 2007
 Cardiodactylus jdoeria Robillard, 2014
 Cardiodactylus kondoi Otte, 2007
 Cardiodactylus kotandora Robillard, 2014
 Cardiodactylus kraussi Otte, 2007
 Cardiodactylus kusaiense Otte, 2007
 Cardiodactylus lampongsi Robillard & Gorochov, 2014
 Cardiodactylus loboe Robillard, 2014
 Cardiodactylus lombrinjani Robillard, 2014
 Cardiodactylus lucus Dong & Robillard, 2016
 Cardiodactylus maai Otte, 2007
 Cardiodactylus mamai Otte, 2007
 Cardiodactylus manus Otte, 2007
 Cardiodactylus muiri Otte, 2007
 Cardiodactylus murakami Otte, 2007
 Cardiodactylus muria Robillard, 2014
 Cardiodactylus novaeguineae (Haan, 1844)type species (as Gryllus novaeguineae Haan)
 Cardiodactylus obi Gorochov & Robillard, 2014
 Cardiodactylus oeroe Robillard, 2014
 Cardiodactylus palawan Gorochov, 2014
 Cardiodactylus pelagus Otte, 2007
 Cardiodactylus quatei Otte, 2007
 Cardiodactylus reticulatus Gorochov, 2014
 Cardiodactylus riga Otte, 2007
 Cardiodactylus rizali Robillard, 2014
 Cardiodactylus sedlaceki Otte, 2007
 Cardiodactylus singapura Robillard, 2011
 Cardiodactylus sumba Robillard, 2014
 Cardiodactylus talaudae Robillard, 2014
 Cardiodactylus tangkoko Gorochov, 2014
 Cardiodactylus tankara Robillard, 2009
 Cardiodactylus tello Robillard, 2014
 Cardiodactylus thailandia Robillard, 2011
 Cardiodactylus variegatus Gorochov & Robillard, 2014
 Cardiodactylus vella Otte, 2007
 nomen dubium Cardiodactylus praecipuus (Walker, 1869)

References

External links
 
 

Ensifera genera
crickets
Orthoptera of Asia